Salix floridana, the Florida willow, is a species of willow in the family Salicaceae. It is native to the southeastern United States in northern Florida and southwestern Georgia.

Description
Salix floridana  is a deciduous shrub or small tree growing to 6 m tall. The leaves are alternate, 5–15 cm long and 2–5 cm broad, with a very finely serrated margin; they are green above, and paler below with short whitish hairs.

The flowers are produced in catkins in early spring before the new leaves appear; it is dioecious, with male and female catkins on separate plants. The male catkins are 4–5.5 cm long; the female catkins are 5–7.5 cm long.

References

floridana
Flora of Florida
Flora of Georgia (U.S. state)
Trees of the Southeastern United States
Taxonomy articles created by Polbot
Taxa named by Alvan Wentworth Chapman